Ronald Dean Shavlik (December 4, 1933 – June 27, 1983) was an American professional basketball player. He was an All-American center for the NC State Wolfpack in the 1950s. He later played briefly for the New York Knicks of the National Basketball Association (NBA). 

Shavlik established a janitorial service, Carolina Maintenance Co., as a college student in 1956. After his playing career, he focused on growing the business. Shavlik died of cancer at the age of 49. 

His grandson, Shavlik Randolph, played college basketball for Duke University and has played professionally in the NBA. On November 4, 2018, Shavlik was inducted into the Raleigh Hall of Fame.

See also
List of second-generation National Basketball Association players
List of NCAA Division I men's basketball players with 30 or more rebounds in a game
List of NCAA Division I men's basketball career rebounding leaders

References

External links
Basketball-reference.com bio

1933 births
1983 deaths
All-American college men's basketball players
Amateur Athletic Union men's basketball players
American men's basketball players
Basketball players from Denver
Centers (basketball)
NC State Wolfpack men's basketball players
New York Knicks draft picks
New York Knicks players